Dean Guitars, commonly referred to simply as Dean, is an American importer and maker of stringed instruments and musical products with its headquarters in Tampa, Florida.

Its products include solid-body electric guitars, bass guitars, and acoustic guitars. The company also distributes resonators, basses, banjos, mandolins, ukuleles, amplifiers, guitar cases, accessories, and custom guitar pickups.

The company was founded in Chicago, Illinois, in 1976 by Dean Zelinsky, but came to prominence under Elliott Rubinson in 1997 after his company, Armadillo Enterprises, purchased the business.

History 
Dean Guitars started in 1976 and made instruments used by bands such as Heart, Kansas, the Cars, Molly Hatchet, Triumph and ZZ Top.

With the advent of the Superstrat and grunge music, Dean Zelinsky sold the business to Oscar Medeiros of Tropical Music, who gained ownership of the brand from 1986, and until 1995 focused on selling to Latin bands overseas. The company had all but disappeared from the American market at that point.

Armadillo Enterprises, under the leadership of Elliott Rubinson, then purchased the business in 1997. Rubinson, a musician who toured as a bass player for the Michael Schenker Group, Uli Jon Roth and Michael Angelo Batio expanded Dean's products to include acoustic, electric and bass guitars; mandolins, banjos and ukuleles with prices from less than $99 to more than $13,000. Rubinson had previously built Thoroughbred Music, a music retail store, music supply, and music clinic. Rubinson sold Thoroughbred to Sam Ash Music in 1999 so he could focus on Dean.

After getting a number of endorser-user guitarists (including Dimebag Darrell, Michael Angelo Batio, Michael Schenker, Leslie West, Dave Mustaine, Michael Amott, and Jacky Vincent), Dean Guitars' popularity increased. Under Armadillo Enterprises the company outgrew its Clearwater site and moved to a larger building that includes a custom guitar shop. Today the company also assembles guitar pickups and guitar parts.

In December 2016, Elliott Rubinson's son, Evan Rubinson, assumed the position of President and CEO at Armadillo Enterprises (which includes Dean Guitars, Luna Guitars, and ddrum).

In February 2017, Elliott "Dean" Rubinson died from cancer. Richard Ash, CEO of Sam Ash Music Stores, said, "Elliott was a true genius. He would have been successful in any business but he went with his passion for music and built his business around it... He was truly one of my heroes. RIP Elliott Rubinson."

Instruments 

Dean has the line of electric guitars that includes the ML, V, Z, Cadillac, Splittail, Soltero, EVO, Icon, Custom Zone, Vendetta and Deceiver models.

Dean also has many signature electric guitar models. The company offers a number of Dimebag Darrell models.

The company has also worked closely with Dave Mustaine of Megadeth on a line of guitars. These cost from around $300 for imports to over $6000 for USA-built instruments. The Dean USA Dave Mustaine Signature VMNT Holy Grail  electric guitar, a more recent incarnation of the V introduced in 2016, is an example of the brand.

Dean also makes signature models for Bret Michaels, Michael Schenker, Leslie West, Michael Angelo Batio, Michael Amott, Rusty Cooley, and other artists.

The company's bass guitar models include the ML, V, Z, Cadillac, Edge, Metal Man / Demonator, Hillsboro, Entwistle, EVO, Razorback, and Custom Zone. Dean also imports and markets other string instruments such as resonator guitars, mandolins and banjos.

In 2017, Dean unveiled several new musical instruments to commemorate the company's 40th anniversary.

In 2018, the company formed a partnership between Dean USA Custom Shop and Angel's Envy Bourbon to produce the Dean Envy Series guitars made from whiskey cask barrels.

In November of 2019, Kerry King, guitarist of Slayer, joined Dean Guitars, and in 2020 they made 2 models: limited edition and standard version

Affiliated companies 
Armadillo Enterprises, the parent company of Dean Guitars, also owns Luna Guitars and ddrum.

Notes

References

External links 

 
 Elliott Rubinson Interview NAMM Oral History Program (2010)
 Evan Rubinson Article Evan Rubinson’s vision for the future(2018)

Dean Guitars products
Guitar amplifier manufacturers
Manufacturing companies based in Florida
Dean guitars
Dean bass guitars
Mandolin makers